is a professional Japanese baseball player. He is an outfielder for the Hiroshima Toyo Carp of Nippon Professional Baseball (NPB).

References 

1996 births
Living people
Baseball people from Kagawa Prefecture
Nippon Professional Baseball outfielders
Hiroshima Toyo Carp players